Agniputhri is a 1967 Indian Malayalam-language film, directed by M. Krishnan Nair and produced by Prem Navas. The film stars Prem Nazir, Sheela, T. R. Omana and T. S. Muthaiah. The film had musical score and songs composed by M. S. Baburaj. It won the National Film Award for Best Screenplay. The film was remade in Hindi as Darpan.

Cast

Prem Nazir as Rajendran
Sheela as Sindhu
T. R. Omana as Muthassi
T. S. Muthaiah as Dr. Jayadevan
Aranmula Ponnamma as Saraswathi
Baby Usha (Usharani) as Bindu
Meena
T. K. Balachandran as Balachandran
Vasantha as Sandhya
Adoor Bhasi as Dance Master Parvathidas
Bahadoor as Appunni Nair
S. P. Pillai as Adukkalakkaran Embranthiri
Kaduvakulam Antony

Soundtrack
The music was composed by M. S. Baburaj and the lyrics were written by Vayalar Ramavarma.

Awards
Filmfare Award for Best Film - Malayalam won by Prem Nawaz (1967)

References

External links
 

1967 films
1960s Malayalam-language films
Films whose writer won the Best Original Screenplay National Film Award
Films directed by M. Krishnan Nair
Malayalam films remade in other languages